Boucher may refer to:
Boucher (surname), a family name (including a list of people with that name)
Boucher Manufacturing Company, an American toy company 
R. v. Boucher, a 1951 Supreme Court of Canada decision that overturned a conviction for seditious libel in criticizing the government
In re Boucher, a 2007 U.S. criminal case raising the question of compelled production of cryptographic keys
Boucher (horse), a Thoroughbred racehorse
Boucher, Québec, a former name of Trois-Rives, Québec

See also
Boucherville, a city in the Montérégie region in Quebec, Canada
Longueuil—Pierre-Boucher, a federal electoral district in Québec, Canada
Havre Boucher, a Canadian village in Antigonish County, Nova Scotia
Butcher (disambiguation)